1993 bombing of RSS office in Chennai refers to the bombing of a head office of the Rashtriya Swayamsevak Sangh  in Chennai in Tamil Nadu on 8 August 1993 by Islamist terrorists. The bombings left eleven people dead and seven others injured.

The special CBI court tried eighteen of the accused under the now-defunct Terrorist and Disruptive Activities (Prevention) Act. They had been earlier given life imprisonment by a TADA court in Chennai for their involvement in the blast on 8 August 1993 at the RSS office in Chennai.   The CBI has announced a reward of Rs.10 lakh for providing credible information about Mushtaq Ahmed, one of the main accused in the blast.

References

External links 

 
 
CBI  arrested Mustaq Ahmed from the outskirts of Chennai, CBI spokesperson Abhishek Dayal said.

Terrorist incidents in India in 1993
Mass murder in 1993
Improvised explosive device bombings in India
1990s in Chennai
1990s in Tamil Nadu
Crime in Tamil Nadu
Islamic terrorist incidents in 1993
Building bombings in India